Ink (Eric Gitter) is a fictional superhero character appearing in American comic books published by Marvel Comics. The character was created by Marc Guggenheim and Yanick Paquette. As a member of the Young X-Men, the character is depicted as a normal human being who gained superpowers after being tattooed by a mutant. Each of his tattoos gives him a different power.

Fictional character biography

Final Genesis
Ink is one of the founding members of the Young X-Men team that believed themselves to have been organized by Cyclops. He is a loud-mouthed and rude teenager with a criminal past. He is introduced when two police officers attempt to arrest him in a tattoo parlor. He fights back using his newly acquired ability to make others violently ill with a touch by utilizing a new tattoo on his hand of a biohazard symbol, making the police officer instantly very sick. Despite this, he is arrested anyway.
 
While Ink waits in jail, a prison guard releases him, in the process revealing himself to be Cyclops, leader of the X-Men. In short order, Eric is recruited into Cyclops' junior X-Men team. The teens are assembled in the Danger Cave, a training facility where they train for their first mission: assassinating the original members of the New Mutants who have gone rogue.

Cyclops sends Ink and a fellow recruit, Blindfold, to attack Dani Moonstar. On their way to Moonstar's cabin, they had a conversation where Blindfold implied Ink was not a mutant. They were successful in their mission, and just after Blindfold knocks Moonstar unconscious, Ink betrays her and knocked out Blindfold, warning her that she should have seen that coming. Ink was paid to deliver both Blindfold and Moonstar to Donald Pierce, which he did, though he refused to kill them. He delivers the two women to Pierce, who refers to him as a mercenary.

"Cyclops" is later revealed to be Pierce in disguise, whose goal is to manipulate the Young X-Men into killing the former New Mutants. Upon learning this, Ink appears to suffer a crisis of conscience and leads the Young X-Men and New Mutants to Pierce's hideout. They subdue Pierce, but not before Wolf Cub is killed, leaving Ink to deal with his own feelings of guilt over his involvement.

Book of Revelations
Later, it is revealed that Ink is actually a normal human being, and that his tattoo artist, Leon Nunez is a mutant. Presumably, the tattoos he draws gave Ink his powers because Ink explains the desired functions of each tattoo prior to getting them to Nunez. Emma Frost runs a scan on him at Dani Moonstar's request that confirmed him as a baseline human, and Pierce knew this before he recruited him. Ink takes the knowledge hard and quits the team, feeling unwelcome already for his involvement with Pierce.

While wandering San Francisco drunk, he is attacked by the Hellfire Cult, a mutant-hating gang. Ink easily defeats them, telling them that he's not a mutant and they wasted their time. Then a girl named Cipher appears and tells him he's still an X-Man and his friends are being attacked by the Y-Men, a group of gang members similarly empowered like Ink by his tattoo artist. Together they go to Nunez and force him to give Ink two new tattoos, a caduceus symbol on his left palm and the Phoenix Force symbol over his eye, much like Phoenix-hosts Jean Grey and Rachel Summers. They then go save the Young X-Men from the Y-Men. Ink saves and heals Dani Moonstar with the caduceus tattoo and defeats the Y-Men with his Phoenix powers, explaining that he believed the Phoenix Force to be omnipotent, thus granting him the ability to remove the Y-Men's tattooed powers.

It is decided later that Ink will stay with the X-Men and train, Cyclops not wanting someone to run around with Phoenix-like powers unwatched.  Moonstar and Sunspot explain that inking powered tattoos saps Nunez's willpower and that adding the Phoenix Force tattoo to Ink pushed him too hard, leaving Nunez comatose. In this state, he is barely conscious enough to maintain Ink's powers, though if he ever wakes up, Ink will revert to a normal tattooed human. Graymalkin later offers his friendship to Ink, noting that he too understands what it feels like to be different and ostracized.

When Dust begins to die from a hidden health condition, Ink attempts to heal her with his caduceus tattoo, but fails. Her death upsets him, causing the others to realize that he now cares about the team. He later speaks to her prepared body, stating that she is the last person to deserve death and he is the first.  Knowing that his Phoenix tattoo is untested, he uses it to revive her. He is successful, but the strain leaves him comatose, Beast stating that his mind has activity, but is subdued, "as if it's been overcharged". Beast also postulates that his current state is because his tattoo could only approximate the powers of the Phoenix and that he never actually contained the true energies associated with the Phoenix Force, making his actions an incredible strain. His actions may have ramifications for the future, with the last two issues of Young X-Men depicting a dystopian future and a villainous and powerful Dust seeking to kill all mutants and Ink in particular for "killing her soul" by reviving her.

Dark Avengers/Uncanny X-Men
He appears in unexplained full recovery containing the San Francisco riots, as well as later in the fight against the Dark Avengers, alongside other X-Men in the Dark Avengers/Uncanny X-Men: Utopia storyline.

Powers and abilities
Ink has no powers of his own. Instead, he had access to a mutant tattoo artist, Leon Nunez, with the power of granting superpowers to other beings by tattooing iconic "power symbols" on them, evocative of the power he wants to bestow. The downside to this is that it takes away a little bit of Nunez's will every time he does it. Nunez made Ink believe that his powers were his own, purposely misleading him into believing he was a mutant. Since granting Ink his last tattoo—the omnipotent Phoenix Force symbol around his eye—Leon Nunez has been in a catatonic state. If he were to wake up, it is thought that Ink's power would disappear, leaving him a normal boy. This was not the case however as Eric was able to get more body art after his phoenix tattoo was removed and he had obtained new body art.

So far, Ink has the following tattoos and powers:

 The tattoo on his right palm in the shape of a biohazard symbol which gives him the power to make someone extremely ill.
 The Caduceus symbol on his right hand allows him to heal others.
 The tattoo on his left hand gives him super strength. The lines look similar to the banding on Colossus' flesh when he transforms, indicating a toughening of Ink's flesh also.
 The "explosive" symbol tattooed on his right biceps allows him to blow up objects, and once even helped him punch through a wall.
 The two lightning bolt tattoos on his head give him the ability to read minds, but can be blocked by psi-shields, taken from a comic book depiction of psychic abilities (actually an early Marvel Comics publication image of Professor X).
 The tattoos of wings on his back grant him flight.
 The Phoenix Force symbol over his right eye allows him to use a facsimile of the Phoenix's powers. This was the tattoo that caused Leon to go into a coma upon adding it to Eric's body. It was eventually removed by the time of his next appearance so his tattoo artist could add more inks.
 An alternate reality counterpart on Battleworld had a nuclear symbol tattooed to his right palm, where he could deliver atomic explosions using it.
 The red cross on his neck gives him self-healing powers.
 The target symbol above his left pectoral allows him to emit beams of energy from his eyes much like Cyclops.

Other versions

Young X-Men "End of Days"
In a dystopic future depicted in the final two issues of "Young X-Men", a disproportionately aged, wheelchair-using, heavily tattooed, and seemingly brain dead Ink lives on "Xaviera", a former mutant safe-haven independent state and utopia along with adult versions of Anole and Graymalkin and an aged Emma Frost (now calling herself "Diamondheart"), and Wolverine, the only four remaining mutants on Xaviera. Emma constantly hopes that he will awaken and speak, though Wolverine states that he never does. Dust suddenly appears, now greatly changed in her appearance and persona with altered powers. She quickly confronts and kills the others and finds Ink. It is then that Ink speaks, acknowledging her presence. They discuss Sooraya's resentment of mutants "allowing her to die" and how Ink "killed" and "corrupted" her soul and making her what she is now by reviving her. Ink states that he was trying to do the opposite and asks her if she recognizes the gravity of her actions. Understanding that she does not, he tells her to get it over with and she kills him, stating that she is sorry as she knows that his heart was in the right place.

In other media

Film
 Ink appears in X-Men: Days of Future Past, portrayed by Gregg Lowe. At the start of film, an older version of Ink appeared briefly as a prisoner in a mutant internment camp in the year 2023 by the mutant-killing robots Sentinels. In 1973, a younger Ink is shown as an American mutant G.I. during the Vietnam War - along with Alex Summers, Toad, and other mutants - who is nearly taken into custody by Major William Stryker for Bolivar Trask's experiments as part of his anti-mutant efforts before they are rescued by Mystique. He is later shown in a restaurant as he watches Magneto's broadcast.

References

External links
 Ink at Marvel Wiki
 Ink at Comic Vine

Comics characters introduced in 2008
Characters created by Marc Guggenheim
Fictional criminals
Marvel Comics characters with superhuman strength
Marvel Comics male superheroes